Sailors' Chapel, Seamen's Chapel or Fishermen's Chapel is a Grade I listed building in Angle, Pembrokeshire, Wales. The chapel, which is dedicated to St Anthony, is located in the churchyard of St Mary's parish church.

The chapel is a small, single-cell vaulted building above a raised and vaulted crypt. It was founded in the 15th century (1447) by Edward de Shirburn a "knight of Nangle". It was restored in 1853, and again by Elizabeth Mirehouse in 1862, and rededicated in 1929. Originally a receiving place, or charnel-house, for the corpses of drowned sailors, it became a chapel of rest in the 20th century.

Constructed of coarse masonry under a modern tiled roof with a Celtic cross finial, the chapel has Victorian stained glass windows, one of which depicts the miracle of Christ walking upon the sea. There is a stone altar.

References

Angle
Chapels in Pembrokeshire